Mthenjwa Amon Zondi (born 24 December 1966) is a South African politician who has served in the National Assembly since 2020. Prior to serving in parliament, he served as a member of the KwaZulu-Natal Legislature from 2014 to 2019. Zondi is a member of the African National Congress.

Political career
In 2014 Zondi stood for election to the KwaZulu-Natal Legislature as 51st on the African National Congress's provincial legislature list. He was elected and sworn in on 21 May 2014.

In 2019 he stood for re-election at 50th. The ANC won only 44 seats in the provincial legislature and Zondi was not elected to return to the legislature.

On 31 August 2020, Zondi was sworn in as a member of the National Assembly of South Africa, replacing Dorah Dunana Dlamini, who died in June. As of 8 October 2020, he serves as a member of the  Portfolio Committee on Sports, Arts and Culture.

References

External links
Mr Mthenjwa Amon Zondi at Parliament of South Africa

Living people
1966 births
Zulu people
Members of the National Assembly of South Africa
African National Congress politicians
Members of the KwaZulu-Natal Legislature